is a Japanese storyboard artist and director.

After graduating Osaka Designers' College, Asaka entered Madhouse. He was inspired to become a director by Phoenix: Yamato Chapter and made his debut as an episode director in episode 40 of Yawara!. He made his chief directorial debut with the 1993 OVA POPS. His noted works include, among others, Cardcaptor Sakura (his directorial anime television series debut), Chobits, Gunslinger Girl, Nana, Chihayafuru, and My Love Story!!. In 1999, he won the Theatrical Film Award in the Animation Kobe awards.

Filmography

TV series
Cardcaptor Sakura (1998–2000) - Director
Galaxy Angel (2001) - Director
Galaxy Angel Z (2002) - Director
Chobits (2002) - Director
Gunslinger Girl (2003–2004) - Director
Nana (2006–2007) - Director
No Longer Human (2009) - Director
Chihayafuru (2011–2012) - Director
Chihayafuru 2 (2013) - Director
My Love Story!! (2015) - Director
Cardcaptor Sakura: Clear Card (2018) - Director
Chihayafuru 3 (2019) - Director
My Love Story with Yamada-kun at Lv999 (2023) - Director

TV specials
Yawara! Special: Zutto Kimi no Koto ga... (1996) - Director

Films
Cardcaptor Sakura: The Movie (1999) - Director
Cardcaptor Sakura Movie 2: The Sealed Card (2000) - Director
Leave It To Kero! Movie (2000) - Story composition

OVAs
POPS (1993; director)

Other works
Attack! Future's Challenge! J League (1996; artbook)
Tankōbon: Shiobunsha, art: Akihiko Tanaka, 
Noel (1996; game, storyboards)
PlayStation game.
Ryūjin Numa (2001; storyboards)
Special anime museum screening by Shotaro Ishinomori.
Last Order: Final Fantasy VII (2005; director, storyboards)
Limited-edition special DVD production included in Final Fantasy VII: Advent Children.

References

External links
 Morio Asaka at TAF 2006 at Madhouse website 
 Madhouse People File: Morio Asaka 
 Morio Asaka anime works at Media Arts Database 
 

Anime directors
Japanese film directors
1967 births
Japanese animators
People from Hyōgo Prefecture
Living people
Madhouse (company) people